Edgard Van Boxtaele (2 December 1888 – 16 April 1958) was a Belgian footballer. He played in nine matches for the Belgium national football team from 1908 to 1911.

References

External links
 

1888 births
1958 deaths
Belgian footballers
Belgium international footballers
Place of birth missing
Association football forwards